Adam Pribićević (Kostajnica, Austria-Hungary, 24 December 1880 – Windsor, Ontario, Canada, 7 February 1957) was a Croatian Serb publisher, writer, and politician.

Biography
Pribićević was born in Kostajnica, to a well-known family of Serbs of Croatia. After graduating from gymnasium (high school) in Sremski Karlovci, he studied law at Zagreb. He began his political activities by joining the Srpska Samostalna Stranka (Independent Serbian Party). He published articles in the periodicals Srbobran and Srpsko kolo. A supporter of the social philosophy of Tomáš Garrigue Masaryk, Adam emphasized the role of peasants in the social development of Serbia. Along with a group of Serbian politicians from Croatia, Adam was arrested during a mounting conflict between the Croatian-Serbian Coalition and the Austro-Hungarian authorities. It became apparent that the evidence in the earlier trial had been fabricated with the foreknowledge of the Austro-Hungarian authorities.

After his release, Adam joined the editorial staff of Srpsko kolo. In 1913 on a visit to Belgrade Adam forewarned Nikola Pašić about a compromise between the Croatian-Serbian Coalition in Habsburg Croatia and the Austrian government. He also worked as an editor of the periodical Narod. In 1924 he settled in Kosovo, where he was active in the Independent Democratic Party, founded by his brother Svetozar Pribičević. He also edited the periodical Reč. After the death of his brother Svetozar, Adam was elected to parliament in 1936. In 1938 he became chairman of the Samostalna Demokratska Stranka (Independent Democratic Party).

Between the two world wars, he held many important posts in Yugoslavia. He was a jurist, journalist, and political activist who, with his brother Milan, became "the voice of return to the virtues of rural life."

His books were banned by the Yugoslav communist government in 1947.

He committed suicide on 7 February 1957 in Windsor, Ontario. 

From 2008, the new 16th street in Busije, a part of Belgrade, carries his name.

Personal life
He had three brothers: Milan, Svetozar and Valerian.

Works
 Seljak, 1936
 Naseljavanja Srba po Hrvatskoj i Dalmaciji, 1954
 Od gospodina do seljaka
 Selo kao moralni činilac u životu naroda, 1954
 The Problem of Austro-Hungaria, Voice of Canadian Serbs, 1949 
 The Memorandum on Crimes of Genocide Committed against the Serbian People by the Government of the 'Independent State of Croatia' during World War II. Addressed to the Fifth General Assembly of the United Nations, 1950, by Adam Pribićević, Dr. Vladimir Belajčić, and Dr. Branko Miljuš.

References

Sources

External links
 Jugoslavija na ruševinama Srbije (2): Evropa spasava Srbe

1880 births
1957 suicides
People from Hrvatska Kostajnica
People from the Kingdom of Croatia-Slavonia
Serbs of Croatia
Yugoslav emigrants to Canada
Canadian people of Serbian descent
Democratic Party (Yugoslavia) politicians
Independent Democratic Party (Yugoslavia) politicians
Government ministers of Yugoslavia
Representatives in the Yugoslav National Assembly (1921–1941)
Austro-Hungarian military personnel of World War I
Serbian military personnel of World War I
Suicides in Ontario
Royal Serbian Army soldiers